Warrington Rural District was, from 1894 to 1974, a local government district in the administrative county of Lancashire.

It was formed a rural district under the Local Government Act 1894 from the Warrington rural sanitary district, and was centred on territory north of the town of Warrington (which was broadly shared with, but separate from, the County Borough of Warrington). In 1974, the district was abolished and became part of the new Borough of Warrington which was transferred to Cheshire.

Boundaries
It covered the following parishes initially:

Burtonwood
Cuerdley
Great Sankey
Houghton, Middleton and Arbury
Little Sankey
Penketh
Poulton with Fearnhead
Rixton with Glazebrook
Southworth with Croft
Winwick with Hulme
Woolston with Martinscroft

The parish of Little Sankey, which had been formed from that part of Warrington parish not in Warrington borough; was added to Warrington in 1896.

Reorganisation
The district was reorganised in 1933, by taking in part of the disbanded Leigh Rural District. Several parishes were reorganised

Burtonwood
Croft
Cuerdley
Great Sankey
Penketh
Poulton with Fearnhead
Rixton with Glazebrook
Winwick
Woolston

The district was abolished on 1 April 1974, under the Local Government Act 1972. It became part of the new borough of Warrington in the non-metropolitan county of Cheshire.

References

External links

Districts of England created by the Local Government Act 1894
Districts of England abolished by the Local Government Act 1972
History of Cheshire
History of Lancashire
Rural districts of England